The Samsung Galaxy Tab S5e is an Android-based tablets designed, developed, and marketed by Samsung Electronics. This tablet computer was announced on February 15, 2019, and it was released on April 26, 2019.

Specifications

Hardware 
The Samsung Galaxy Tab S5e is built with an aluminum frame and a aluminum back for the screen. The device is available in Black, Gold, Silver. It has stereo loudspeakers with AKG tuning. A USB-C port is used for charging and connecting other accessories.

The Samsung Galaxy Tab S5e uses the Qualcomm Snapdragon 670 system-on-chip, with 4 GB or 6 GB of RAM and 64 GB, 128 GB of non-expandable eMMC 5.1 internal storage.

The Samsung Galaxy Tab S5e has a 7040 mAh battery, and is capable of fast charging at up to 18 W.

The Samsung Galaxy Tab S5e features a 10.5-inch 2560 x 1600 Super AMOLED display. The display has a 16:10 aspect ratio.

The Samsung Galaxy Tab S5e includes dual rear-facing cameras. The wide 26 mm f/2.0 lens 13-megapixel sensor, the front-facing camera uses an 8-megapixel sensor. It is capable of recording 4K video at 30 fps.

Software 
The Samsung Galaxy Tab S5e shipped with Android Pie with One UI 1.1. And, it was updated to Android 11 with One UI 3.1.

References 

Samsung Galaxy Tab series
Android (operating system) devices
Tab
Tablet computers
Tablet computers introduced in 2019